Ian Mitchell (born 14 December 1977) is a South African cricketer. He played in 40 first-class and 53 List A matches for Border from 1995 to 2004.

See also
 List of Border representative cricketers

References

External links
 

1977 births
Living people
South African cricketers
Border cricketers
Eastern Province cricketers
Cricketers from Johannesburg